BRP Laguna (LS-501) is an  currently under the Philippine Navy. She was transferred to the Philippine Navy on 13 September 1976.

Formerly known as USS LST-230, She was built for the United States Navy during World War II. LST-230 was laid down on 10 June 1943 at Seneca, Illinois, by the Chicago Bridge & Iron Co. The vessel was launched on 12 October 1943, sponsored by Mrs. Lottie Reeks. LST-230 was commissioned on 3 November 1943. She was previously known as BRP Laguna (LT-501) prior to a classification change implemented by the Philippine Navy starting in April 2016

Service history
During World War II, LST-230 was assigned to the European theater and participated in the invasion of Normandy in June 1944 and the invasion of southern France in August and September 1944. Following the war, LST-230 performed occupation duty in the Far East in September 1945 and March 1946. LST-230 earned two battle stars for World War II service.

She returned to the United States and was decommissioned on 4 March 1946 and was transferred to the Shipping Control Authority, Japan, on 31 March 1952, where she operated as T-LST-230. T-LST-230 was transferred to the Philippine Navy on 13 September 1976, operating as BRP Laguna (LT-501).

See also
 List of United States Navy LSTs

References 

Ships built in Seneca, Illinois
1943 ships
LST-1-class tank landing ships of the Philippine Navy